Wraparound, wrap around, or wrap-around is anything that wraps around something.

It may more specifically refer to:

Apparel
 Wraparound sunglasses or goggles
 Wraparound baby sling, or wrap, a piece of cloth that supports a baby
 Wraparound clothing, also known as wrapper, e.g., wrap-around dress or archaic wraparound, scarf, shoal, tunics

Arts, entertainment, and media

Music
 Wrap Around Joy, 1974 album by Carole King
 "Wrap Around Shades", a song on the 1995 Zumpano album Look What the Rookie Did
 "Wrapped Around", country song by Brad Paisley

Games and gaming
 Wrap-around straight, a non-standard poker hand
 Wraparound (video games), gameplay element

Other arts, entertainment, and media
 Wraparound animation short, 
 Wraparound cover, e.g.:
 Book cover, protective covering binding the pages of a book
CD/DVD case
 Wraparound sleeve, for a record
 Wraparound program, in television broadcasting

Business, finance, and insurance
 Wraparound mortgage, more commonly known as a "wrap", a form of secondary financing for the purchase of real property
 Wraparound vehicle service agreement, a form of extended warranty

Sports
 Wrap around, a hockey move
 Wrap around, a trick done on a skateboard while freestyle skateboarding
 Wraparound, a generally individual action used by basketball players to pass by defenders

Other uses
 Wraparound (childcare), an intensive, individualized care management process for youths with serious or complex needs
 Wraparound, or integer overflow, numerical overflow 
 Wraparound bridge, guitar bridge
 Wraparound corkscrew, rollercoaster
 Wraparound couch, a type of sofa
 Wrap around MRI artifact

See also
 Cover (disambiguation)
 Scroll (disambiguation)
 Word wrap, in word processing
 Wrap (disambiguation)